The women's marathon swimming over a distance of 10 kilometres at the 2012 Olympic Games in London took place on 9 August in the Serpentine at Hyde Park in London, United Kingdom.

Hungary's Éva Risztov ended her eight-year absence from Olympic action to capture the women's 10 km marathon title in open water swimming. Leading most of the stretch in a grueling race, she held off a late resistant surge from American teen Haley Anderson on the last 50 metres to slam the timing touch pads and claim her first Olympic gold medal in 1:57:38.2. Swimming into the sixth and final lap, Anderson mounted a serious challenge against Italy's Martina Grimaldi for two more Olympic medals, but finished closely behind Risztov by 0.4 seconds with a silver-medal time in 1:57:38.6. Meanwhile, Grimaldi stunned the entire home crowd that lined the lake in one of London's iconic parks, as she picked off Great Britain's overwhelming favorite Keri-anne Payne (1:57:42.2) by a small fraction of a second for the bronze in 1:57:41.8.

Germany's Angela Maurer dropped off from the leading pack before the final stretch to fifth in 1:57:52.8, while Australia's Melissa Gorman, who opened the race with an early lead, faded further from the field to eleventh in 1:58:53.1.

Among the twenty-five swimmers registered in the field, two of them were unable to finish the race, while the other one did not officially compete. South Africa's Jessica Roux was pulled from the water halfway through the race to seek medical attention, while Brazil's Poliana Okimoto, who started the race in fourteenth but steadily fell back to twentieth with only two laps left, fainted from dehydration after she was hauled into one of the safety boats.

Qualification
The women's 10 km open water marathon at the 2012 Olympics featured a field of 25 swimmers:
 10: the top-10 finishers in the 10 km race at the 2011 FINA World Championships. 
 9: the top-9 finishers at the 2012 Olympic Marathon Swim Qualifier (8–9 June 2012 in Setúbal, Portugal). 
 5: one representative from each FINA continent (Africa, Americas, Asia, Europe and Oceania). (These were selected based on the finishes at the qualifying race in Setúbal.)
 1: from the host nation (Great Britain) if not qualified by other means. If Great Britain already had a qualifier in the race, this spot was allocated back into the general pool from the 2012 qualifying race.

Results

References

External links
NBC Olympics Coverage
Map of the Course 

Women's 10000 metre marathon
Olympics
2012 in women's swimming
Women's events at the 2012 Summer Olympics